Elizabeth Cameron Dalman  (born 1934) is an Australian choreographer, teacher, and performer. She founded Australian Dance Theatre and was its artistic director from 1965 to 1975. She is also the founding director of Mirramu Dance Company.

Early life and education 
Elizabeth Cameron Dalman was born in 1934 in Adelaide, South Australia. Her father was a politician in the Menzies government and her mother was an art lover. Dalman began dancing when she was three years old and studied dance during her school years. 

She trained with Nora Stewart, with whom she studied both classical ballet, and also with Margaret Morris modern dance technique.

In 1957 Elizabeth travelled to  London, where watching a single performance "changed her life". The performance was modern dance by Jose Limon's company.

She later travelled to New York to continue her studies. In New York, she studied with Martha Graham, Murray Louis, James Truitte, and Alwin Nikolais. While studying in Germany in 1958, she met American choreographer Eleo Pomare and the two remained friends until his death in August 2008. She lived in Amsterdam with Pomare and other dancers, was particularly influenced by Pomare's style of dance, and wanted to dance in the same style.

In 1994 she obtained Masters of Creative Arts degree from Wollongong University.

In 2012 Elizabeth was conferred a doctorate in dance (PhD) from the University of Western Sydney for her thesis entitled The Quest for an Australian Dance Theatre.

Career in dance 
Returning to New York in 1962, she danced with the Eleo Pomare Dance Company for two years. Back in Adelaide in 1965, she formed the Australian Dance Theatre and for ten years was artistic director.

In 1999, she founded "Weereewa – A Festival of Lake George", which was held in Bungendore, New South Wales. The festival showcased visual and performance artists and writers, and continued more or less biennially until at least 2014.

Mirramu

In 2002 she co-founded (with Vivienne Rogis) and was and is inaugural director of the Mirramu Creative Arts Centre at Lake George, in New South Wales near Canberra.

Mirramu performed at the March 2008 Weereewa - A Festival of Lake George event, and again in 2014, along with dancers from Malaysia and Taiwan.

Other roles and activities
Dalman was a mentor and board member of the Australian Choreographic Centre in Canberra, and she has studied  Indigenous dance forms.

She has taught in Australian universities, and travelled as a performer, choreographer, teacher and researcher, including to Taiwan, Japan and West Africa.

Recognition and awards 
Dalman won five Canberra Critics' Circle Awards for choreography and production between 1990 and 2015.

1994: Australian Artists Creative Fellowship, for five years

1995: Medal of the Order of Australia (OAM), for her contribution to contemporary dance in Australia

1997: Lifetime Achievement Award from the Australian Dance Awards for achievement in dance

2004:  artsACT Creative Artist Fellowship, Canberra

2015: inducted into the Australian Dance Awards Hall of Fame

 2020: Anthea da Silva's painting of Dalman, entitled Elizabeth, winner of the inaugural Darling Portrait Prize

References

External links 

  (The Australian Dance Collection: a Directory of Resources)
 

1934 births
Living people
Australian choreographers
People from Adelaide
Women choreographers
Recipients of the Medal of the Order of Australia